Stewart Hadley (born 30 December 1973) is an English former footballer who played in the Football League for Kidderminster Harriers and Mansfield Town.

References

English footballers
English Football League players
1973 births
Living people
Halesowen Town F.C. players
Derby County F.C. players
Mansfield Town F.C. players
Kidderminster Harriers F.C. players
Worcester City F.C. players
Association football forwards